This is a list of adverse effects of risperidone.  Risperidone, sold under the brand name Risperdal among others, is an antipsychotic.  It is used to treat schizophrenia, bipolar disorder, and irritability associated with autism.

Common adverse effects 

Common adverse effects of risperidone, occurring greater than or equal to 1%, include:

 Rash (oral, adults, 1% to 4%; pediatrics, up to 11% ; IM, less than 4%)
 Hyperprolactinaemia (risperidone is probably the most notorious antipsychotic for causing hyperprolactinaemia via its potent blockade of D2 receptors expressed on the lactotrophic cells of the pituitary) (oral, adults, less than 1%; pediatrics, 49% to 87% ; IM, less than 4%)
 Weight gain (causes less weight gain than clozapine, olanzapine and zotepine, around as much weight gain as quetiapine and more weight gain than amisulpride, aripiprazole, lurasidone, asenapine and ziprasidone) (oral, adult, 8.7% to 20.9%; pediatric, 14% to 32.6% ; IM, adult, 8% to 10%)
 Seborrhea
 Constipation (oral, 8% to 21% ; IM, 5% to 7%)
 Diarrhoea (oral, 1% to 8% ; IM, less than 4%)
 Excessive Salivation (oral, 1% to 10% ; IM, 1% to 4%)
 Increased appetite (oral, adult, more than 5%; pediatric, 4% to 47% ; IM, 4%)
 Indigestion (oral, 2% to 10% ; IM, 6%)
 Nausea (oral, 4% to 16% ; IM, 3% to 4%)
 Vomiting (oral, 10% to 25% ; IM, less than 4%)
 Upper abdominal pain (oral, adult, more than 5%; pediatric, 13% to 16%)
 Xerostomia (oral, 4% to 15% ; IM, up to 7%)
 Akathisia (oral, up to 10% ; IM, 4% to 11%)
 Dizziness (oral, 4% to 16% ; IM, 3% to 11%)
 Dyspnoea 
 Asthenia 
 Agitation
 Urinary incontinence
 Arthralgia
 Myalgia
 Epistaxis
 Somnolence (oral, adult, 3% to 6%; pediatric, 8% to 29% )
 Sleep disturbances
 Major depression, self harm and suicidal thoughts
 Dose-dependent extrapyramidal side effects such as dystonia (oral, adult, 3% to 5%; pediatric, 2% to 6% ; IM, adult, less than 4%), tremor (oral, 2% to 12% ; IM, 3% to 24%) and Parkinsonism (oral, 6% to 28% ; IM, 8% to 15%)
 Blurred vision (oral, 1% to 7% ; IM, 2% to 3%)
 Anxiety (oral, up to 16% IM, less than 4%)
 Cough (oral, adults, 2%; pediatrics, 24% ; IM, 2% to 4%)
 Nasal congestion (oral, adult, 4% to 6%; pediatric, 13%)
 Nasopharyngitis (oral, adult, 3% to 4%; pediatric, 21%)
 Pain in the throat (oral, adult, more than 5%; pediatric, 3% to 10%)
 Upper respiratory tract infection (oral, 2% to 8% ; IM, 2% and 6%)
 Fatigue (oral, adult, 1% to 3%; pediatric, 18% to 42% ; IM, 3% to 9%)
 Generalised pains (IM, 1% to 4%)
 Gynecomastia
 Galactorrhea
 Retrograde ejaculation

Note: The percentage provided next to the adverse effect is the incidence of that adverse effect according to DrugPoint.

Rare adverse effects (but not necessarily causally related)

Rare adverse effects of risperidone, occurring less than 1%, include:

 Prolonged QT interval
 Sudden cardiac death
 Syncope (oral, up to 1% ; IM, up to 2%)
 Diabetic ketoacidosis
 Hypothermia
 Pancreatitis
 Agranulocytosis
 Neutropenia
 Leukopenia
 Thrombocytopenia
 Thrombotic thrombocytopenic purpura
 Stroke (oral, less than 5% ; IM, less than 4%)
 Seizure (oral, 0.3% ; IM, 0.3%)
 Tardive dyskinesia (oral, less than 5% ; IM, less than 4%)
 Priapism
 Pulmonary embolism
 Neuroleptic malignant syndrome (oral, adults, less than 1%; pediatrics, less than 5%)
 Anorexia
 Hypoaesthesia
 Impaired concentration
 Sexual dysfunction
 Angioedema
 Intestinal obstruction
 Megacolon
 Oedema
 Hyponatraemia

Note: The percentage provided next to the adverse effect is the incidence of that adverse effect according to DrugPoint.

References 

Risperidone